
Piła County is a unit of territorial administration and local government (powiat) in Greater Poland Voivodeship, west-central Poland. It came into being on January 1, 1999, as a result of the Polish local government reforms passed in 1998.

As of 2006 its total population is 137,099, out of which the population of Piła is 75,044, that of Wyrzysk is 5,234, that of Ujście is 3,899, that of Łobżenica is 3,172, that of Wysoka is 2,750, and the rural population is 47,000.

Neighbouring counties
Piła County is bordered by Złotów County to the north, Sępólno County and Nakło County to the east, Wągrowiec County to the south-east, Chodzież County and Czarnków-Trzcianka County to the south, and Wałcz County to the north-west.

Administrative division
The county is subdivided into nine gminas (one urban, five urban-rural and three rural). These are listed in the following table, in descending order of population.

References
Polish official population figures 2006

 
Land counties of Greater Poland Voivodeship